

The following lists events that happened during 1947 in Afghanistan.

Because of close ties of kinship and common cultural tradition, Afghanistan is deeply concerned over the question of the right to self-determination of the Afghans of the North-West Frontier Province of India, arising from the creation of the separate independent states of India and Pakistan.

Afghanistan sends an observer-delegate to the Geneva meetings of the UN Conference on Trade and Employment.

Incumbents 
 Monarch – Mohammed Zahir Shah
 Prime Minister – Shah Mahmud Khan

September 30, 1947 
Afghanistan is the only country to vote against the admission of Pakistan to the United Nations.

References 

 
Afghanistan
Years of the 20th century in Afghanistan
Afghanistan
1940s in Afghanistan